Eunice Nketiah Beckmann (born 8 February 1992) is a German professional footballer who plays for 1. FC Köln.

Beckmann was born in Wuppertal to Ghanaian parents.  She started playing with her local youth side, Wuppertaler SV.

Club career

Duisburg, 2008–2010
Beckmann started her senior career at age 17 with Duisburg, originally playing for the second team and then moving to the first time in the Frauen-Bundesliga in 2009.  She made 8 appearances for the first team scoring 2 goals.

Bayern Leverkusen, 2010–2013
Following two seasons Duisburg Beckmann moved to Frauen-Bundesliga club Bayer 04 Leverkusen where she played for three seasons.  She made 51 regular season appearances with the club, scoring 10 goals.

Linköpings FC, 2013
Beckmann then moved to Swedish Damallsvenskan club Linköpings FC signing a one season contract for the 2013 season.  She played 9 regular season games for the club.

Bayern Munich, 2014–2016
Following her season in Sweden Beckman returned to the Frauen-Bundesliga,  this time signing with Bayern Munich.  In December 2014 Beckmann extended her contract with Bayern. In her two and a half seasons with Bayern Beckmann scored 10 goals in 38 regular season appearances.  She went on to win the Frauen-Bundesliga twice with Bayern in 2014–15, where she finished tied for 8th top scorer in the league, and 2015–16.

Boston Breakers, 2016
In May 2016 Beckmann signed with National Women's Soccer League club the Boston Breakers.   Beckmann spent one season with the club, making 11 regular season appearances.

FC Basel 2017–2018
Beckmann signed an 18 month contract with FC Basel, of the Swiss Nationalliga A Women in January 2017.  During her second season with the club Beckmann was the top scorer in the Nationalliga, scoring 25 goals in 26 games.  Beckmann opted to leave the club after her contract expired.

Madrid CFF, 2018–
In August 2018, she transferred to La Liga Iberdrola side Madrid CFF.

Honours

FCR 2001 Duisburg 
Bundesliga: Runner-up (1) 2009–10
German Cup: Winner (1) 2009–10

FC Bayern München 
Bundesliga: Winner 2014–15, 2015–16

We Play Strong
Beckmann is one of UEFA's official ambassadors for #WePlayStrong, a social media and vlogging campaign which was launched in 2018.  The campaign's  "...aim is to promote women's football as much as we can and to make people aware of women's football, really," Evans, another participant explains. "The ultimate goal is to make football the most played sport by females by 2020. So it's a UEFA initiative to get more women and girls playing football, whether they want to be professional or not."  The series, which also originally included professional footballers Sarah Zadrazil, Lisa Evans, Laura Feiersinger and now also includes Petronella Ekroth and Shanice van de Sanden, follows the daily lives of female professional footballers.

Social media 
Instagram
Twitter
WePlayStrong

References

External links 
 
 

1992 births
Living people
Sportspeople from Wuppertal
German women's footballers
German expatriate sportspeople in Spain
Expatriate women's footballers in Spain
FCR 2001 Duisburg players
Bayer 04 Leverkusen (women) players
Damallsvenskan players
Linköpings FC players
FC Bayern Munich (women) players
German sportspeople of Ghanaian descent
Boston Breakers players
Madrid CFF players
National Women's Soccer League players
Women's association football forwards
Footballers from North Rhine-Westphalia
German expatriate sportspeople in Sweden
German expatriate sportspeople in the United States
FC Basel Frauen players
Swiss Women's Super League players
Frauen-Bundesliga players
1. FC Köln (women) players